OTP37 is an Indonesian football club based in Mamuju, West Sulawesi. They are currently playing at Liga 3 and their homebase is Manakarra Stadium.

Honours
 Liga 3 West Sulawesi
 Champion: 2018
 Runner-up: 2021

References

Football clubs in Indonesia
Football clubs in West Sulawesi
Association football clubs established in 2015
2015 establishments in Indonesia